John S. Garrison is an American author and scholar of William Shakespeare and Renaissance literature. He is a professor of English at Grinnell College. In 2021, he was named a recipient of a Guggenheim Fellowship for his scholarship on
English literature.

Early life and education 
Garrison was born in Pittsburgh. He is the son of civil engineer William Louis
Garrison.

Garrison earned a Bachelor of Arts in English literature from University of California,
Berkeley in 1993 and a Ph.D. from University of California, Davis
in 2007. Prior to obtaining his graduate degree in English literature, Garrison worked for
organizations in both the private and public sectors, including the Levi Strauss Foundation.

Career 

Garrison's writing centers on themes of identity, language, and memory. His book Glass was one of the first books in the Object Lessons series and explores how the material—from mirrors to the telescope to the camera lens—has shaped how humans relate to themselves and to others. His thinking on the cultural history of this material has also been featured in The Atlantic and on the Colin McEnroe Show, an NPR podcast hosted by Colin McEnroe. In Shakespeare and the Afterlife, he explores how human fantasies about what comes after death ultimately reflect anxieties and desires of people in the present moment. Shakespeare at Peace, co-written with Kyle Pivetti, contemplates how possibilities for sustainable peace might be traced to ideas in Renaissance literature. With Pivetti, he is co-editor of the scholarly book series Spotlight on Shakespeare. 

Beyond his non-fiction writing, Garrison also publishes creative work, and in 2004 he was a finalist for the James White Award for short fiction. In addition to being named a Guggenheim Fellow, he has received two fellowships from the National Endowment for the Humanities.

On January 27 2023, Bloomsbury Press announced that Garrison would be writing a volume for the next round of books in their   (Thirty-Three and a Third) book series. The book will discuss  Red, Hot, + Blue, a 1990 compilation album from the  Red Hot Organization featuring tributes to  Cole Porter to raise awareness about the AIDS epidemic.

Bibliography 
Friendship and Queer Theory in the Renaissance. Routledge, 2013. 
Glass. Bloomsbury Publishing, 2015. 
With Kyle Pivetti: Sexuality and Memory in Early Modern England: Literature and the Erotics of Recollection. Routledge, 2015. 

With Kyle Pivetti: Shakespeare at Peace. Routledge, 2018. 
Shakespeare and the Afterlife Oxford University Press, 2018. 
With Emma Depledge and Marissa Nicosia: Making Milton: Print, Authorship, Afterlives. Oxford University Press, 2021. 

With Goran Stanivukovic: Ovid and Masculinity in English Renaissance Literature. McGill–Queen's University Press, 2021. 
With Dustin Dixon: Performing Gods in Classical Antiquity and the Age of Shakespeare. Bloomsbury Publishing, 2021.

References

External links

Living people
American academics of English literature
Grinnell College faculty
Shakespearean scholars
Year of birth missing (living people)
University of California, Davis alumni